The Hamilton County Courthouse in Hamilton, Texas was built in 1887.  It was listed on the National Register of Historic Places in 1980.  It has also been designated a State Antiquities Landmark and a Recorded Texas Historic Landmark.

The 1887 building was Second Empire in style.

The building was enlarged during 1931–1932, according to plans by E. M. Miles.  This added wings to the north and south, and it added pedimented porticos to the east and west.

See also

National Register of Historic Places listings in Hamilton County, Texas
Recorded Texas Historic Landmarks in Hamilton County
List of county courthouses in Texas

References

External links

Second Empire architecture in Texas
Courthouses on the National Register of Historic Places in Texas
National Register of Historic Places in Texas
Government buildings completed in 1887
Hamilton County, Texas